The Latvian men's national under 20 ice hockey team is the national under-20 ice hockey team in Latvia. The team represents Latvia at the International Ice Hockey Federation's IIHF World U20 Championship.

They have played at the top division of the tournament seven times; its recent appearance was the 2022 tournament, where Latvia was called up to replace Russia in the rescheduled tournament due to the country being banned from international ice hockey (Latvia had originally been promoted for 2023). During the tournament, Latvia won its first-ever preliminary round game in the top division.

History

References

Junior
Junior national ice hockey teams